Woodland Township is a township in Decatur County, Iowa, USA.  As of the 2000 census, its population was 95.

History
Woodland Township was named for the valuable timber which once grew there.

Geography
Woodland Township covers an area of 36.34 square miles (94.11 square kilometers). The streams of Brush Creek, Hog Creek and Turkey Run run through this township.

Unincorporated towns
 Bracewell
 Woodland
(This list is based on USGS data and may include former settlements.)

Adjacent townships
 High Point Township (north)
 Clay Township, Wayne County (northeast)
 Jefferson Township, Wayne County (east)
 Grand River Township, Wayne County (southeast)
 Morgan Township (south)
 Hamilton Township (southwest)
 Eden Township (west)
 Center Township (northwest)

Cemeteries
The township contains five cemeteries: Baker, Beaver, Lentz, Saint Marys and Shields.

References
 U.S. Board on Geographic Names (GNIS)
 United States Census Bureau cartographic boundary files

External links
 US-Counties.com
 City-Data.com

Townships in Decatur County, Iowa
Townships in Iowa